Clive Dickinson (birth registered fourth ¼ 1940) is a former professional rugby league footballer who played in the 1960s and 1970s.

Background
Clive Dickinson's birth was registered in Pontefract district, West Riding of Yorkshire, England, and he was a pupil, and  he played alongside Alan Hardisty and Johnny Ward in the school rugby league team, at Ashton Road Secondary School (now the site of Smawthorne Henry Moore Primary School), Castleford.

Playing career

County honours
Clive Dickinson won caps playing  for Yorkshire while at Castleford in the 23–10 victory over Cumberland at Whitehaven's stadium on 11 September 1968, the 10–5 victory over Lancashire at Hull Kingston Rovers' stadium on 25 September 1968, the 12-14 Lancashire at Salford's stadium on 3 September 1969, the 32–12 victory over Lancashire at Castleford's stadium on 13 January 1971, the 34–8 victory over Lancashire at Castleford's stadium on 24 February 1971, and the 32–18 victory over Lancashire at Castleford's stadium on 11 October 1972.

County League appearances
Clive Dickinson played in Castleford's victory in the Yorkshire County League during the 1964–65 season.

Challenge Cup Final appearances
Clive Dickinson played  in Castleford’s 11–6 victory over Salford in the 1969 Challenge Cup Final during the 1968–69 season at Wembley Stadium, London on Saturday 17 May 1969, in front of a crowd of 97,939, and played  in the 7–2 victory over Wigan in the 1970 Challenge Cup Final during the 1969–70 season at Wembley Stadium, London on Saturday 9 May 1970, in front of a crowd of 95,255.

County Cup Final appearances
Clive Dickinson played  in Castleford's 11–22 defeat by Leeds in the 1968 Yorkshire County Cup Final during the 1968–69 season at Belle Vue, Wakefield on Saturday 19 October 1968.

BBC2 Floodlit Trophy Final appearances
Clive Dickinson played right-, i.e. number 10, in Castleford's 4–0 victory over St. Helens in the 1965 BBC2 Floodlit Trophy Final during the 1965–66 season at Knowsley Road, St. Helens on Tuesday 14 December 1965, and played  in the 7–2 victory over Swinton in the 1966 BBC2 Floodlit Trophy Final during the 1966–67 season at Wheldon Road, Castleford on Tuesday 20 December 1966.

References

External links
Search for "Dickinson" at rugbyleagueproject.org
Clive Dickinson Memory Box Search at archive.castigersheritage.com

1940 births
Living people
Castleford Tigers players
English rugby league players
Rugby league hookers
Rugby league players from Pontefract
Yorkshire rugby league team players